is a dish in Japanese cuisine made from agarophytes. Tokoroten has been eaten by the Japanese for over a thousand years. Tokoroten is thought to have been introduced to Japan from China during the Nara period. Tokoroten was traditionally made by boiling tengusa (Gelidium amansii) and then allowing the mixture to congeal into a jelly.

Tokoroten was a popular snack during the summertime in Edo (Tokyo) during the Edo period.  It was originally made to be eaten immediately and was commonly sold around factories.  In the 17th century, it was discovered that freezing tokoroten would result in a stable and dry product known as kanten (agar). While tokoroten can be made from kanten based on seaweeds such as tengusa (Gelidiaceae) and ogonori (Gracilaria), today commercially produced kanten is mostly made from ogonori.

Pressed against a device, the jelly is shaped into noodles. Unlike gelatin desserts, tokoroten has a firmer texture.

Tokoroten was and can be eaten hot (in solution) or cold (as a gel). Flavorings and garnishes can vary from region to region. Today, it is the most common to eat tokoroten with a mixture of vinegar and soy sauce, and sometimes nori, hot pepper, or sesame. In Kansai region, tokoroten is eaten as a dessert with kuromitsu.

Citations

References

Wagashi
Japanese snack food
Japanese noodles